Lucia's Grace is a 2018 Italian comedy-drama film directed by Gianni Zanasi. It was selected to screen in the Directors' Fortnight section at the 2018 Cannes Film Festival.

Cast
 Alba Rohrwacher as Lucia
 Elio Germano as Arturo
 Giuseppe Battiston as Paolo
 Hadas Yaron as the Madonna
 Carlotta Natoli as Claudia
  as Guido
  as Fabio
 Rosa Vannucci as Rosa
  as Giulio Ravi

References

External links
 

2018 films
2018 comedy-drama films
2010s Italian-language films
Films shot in Greece
Films shot in Rome
Italian comedy-drama films
2010s Italian films